Robert Freeman Hopwood (July 24, 1856 – March 1, 1940) was a Republican member of the U.S. House of Representatives from Pennsylvania.

Biography
Robert F. Hopwood was born in Uniontown, Pennsylvania.  He studied under private teachers.  He studied law, was admitted to the bar in 1879 and commenced practice in Uniontown.  He was chairman of the Republican county committee.  He served as attorney for Uniontown Borough from 1881 to 1891, solicitor of Fayette County, Pennsylvania, from 1894 to 1912, and president of the Uniontown Hospital from 1905 to 1920.

Hopwood was elected as a Republican to the Sixty-fourth Congress.  He was an unsuccessful candidate for reelection in 1916.  He resumed the practice of law in Uniontown.  He died at his winter home in St. Petersburg, Florida.  Interment in Oak Grove Cemetery in Uniontown.

Sources

The Political Graveyard

1856 births
1940 deaths
People from Fayette County, Pennsylvania
People from Uniontown, Pennsylvania
Pennsylvania lawyers
Republican Party members of the United States House of Representatives from Pennsylvania